is a railway station operated by Meitetsu on the  Tokoname Line and Chikkō Line located in Minami-ku, Nagoya, Aichi Prefecture, Japan.

Lines
Ōe Station is served by the Meitetsu Tokoname Line and Meitetsu Chikkō Line.

Station layout
Ōe Station has two island platforms and one side platform, serving a total of five tracks.

Platforms

Adjacent stations

History

Ōe Station was opened on May 10, 1917 as a station on the Aichi Electric Railway Company. The Aichi Electric Railway became part of the Meitetsu group on August 1, 1935. Express train service was discontinued from 1990. Later that year, a spur line to Nagoya Port, the Meitetsu Chikkō Line began operations. A new station building was completed in December 2004, at which time the Tranpass system of magnetic fare cards with automatic turnstiles was implemented. Express train services resumed from 2005. The platforms for the Chikkō Line were extended in 2010.

References

External links
 Meitetsu Station information 

Railway stations in Nagoya
Stations of Nagoya Railroad